This is a list of instruments by Hornbostel-Sachs number, covering those instruments that are classified under 311.222 under that system. It includes instruments with a resonator that is not physically integral to the instrument, with more than one string stretched between the ends of a curved and inflexible stick. Anthropologist Thomas Alvad has concluded that instruments of this type are an intermediate stage in the development of the simple musical bow into an arched harp.

These instruments may be classified with a suffix, based on how the strings are caused to vibrate.

4: Hammers or beaters
5: Bare hands and fingers
6: Plectrum
7: Bowing
71: Using a bow
72: Using a wheel
73: Using a ribbon
8: Keyboard
9: Using a mechanical drive

List

References

Notes

311.222